Story of My Heart is the debut studio album by R&B singer Mario Winans under the name  Mario "Yellow Man" Winans. The album was released on June 24, 1997 under Motown Records.

Track listing
 "Prayerlude" (Mario Winans) (0:59)
 "Every Now and Then" (Mario Winans, Kenneth "Hicklo" Hickson) (4:16)
 "Stay with Me" (Mario Winans) (4:32)
 "Arouse Me" (Mario Winans) (4:41)
 "Don't Know" (Mario Winans, Artie Hoyle) (3:59)
 "Love Man" (Mario Winans) (4:34)
 "I Wanna Be Your Man" (Interlude) (Mario Winans) (0:55)
 "You Never Know" (Mario Winans, Kenneth "Hicklo" Hickson) (3:56)
 "Come Back Home" (Mario Winans, Kenneth "Hicklo" Hickson) (4:43)
 "My Sweetheart" (Mario Winans) (3:36)
 "Don't Know Remix" (featuring Mase and Allure) (Mario Winans, Mason Betha, Samuel Barnes, Jean-Claude Olivier) (4:35)
 "It's All Good" (Mario Winans, Kenneth "Hicklo" Hickson) (3:48)
 "Don't Take Your Love Away" (Mario Winans, Kenneth "Hicklo" Hickson) (3:45)
 "One Last Chance" (Mario Winans, Kenneth "Hicklo" Hickson) (3:57)
 "Love Is in the Air" (Mario Winans, Kenneth "Hicklo" Hickson) (5:26)
 "Loving Arms" (Mario Winans, Kenneth "Hicklo" Hickson) (3:58)
 "Take My Breath Away" (Mario Winans, Kenneth "Hicklo" Hickson) (4:14)

Personnel
Mario Winans: All instruments and drum programming on all songs except "Don't Know (Remix)", executive producer
Donyell Boynton: Additional keyboards on "Don't Take Your Love Away"
Poke And Tone: Drum programming on "Don't Know (Remix)"
Timothy "Tyme" Riley: Keyboards on "Don't Know (Remix)"
Brian Smith: Recording engineer
Paul D. Allen: Recording engineer, mixing
Carlton Lynn: Recording engineer
Bryan Frye: Recording engineer
Robin Moore: Recording engineer, mixing
Alvin Speights: mixing
Vernon Mungo: mixing
Andre Harrell: Executive producer
Edward "Eddie F." Ferrell: Executive producer, A&R direction
Perri "Pebbles" Reid: Executive producer
Andrew "Sugar Dice" Ramhdanny: Executive producer
Herb Powers: Mastering
Elli Hershko: Photography
David Harley: Art direction, design

Samples
"Every Now and Then" contains a sample of "Make Me Say It Again Girl" as performed by The Isley Brothers
"Don't Know" contains a sample of "With You in Mind" as performed by Acoustic Alchemy
"Don't Know (Remix)" contains an interpolation of "A Day in the Life" as performed by Diamond D featuring Brand Nubian
"It's All Good" contains a sample of "I'll Be Good to You" as performed by The Brothers Johnson
"Don't Take Your Love Away" contains an interpolation of "Westchester Lady" as performed by Bob James
"One Last Chance" contains a sample of "Sarah Victoria" as performed by Acoustic Alchemy

References

1997 albums
Mario Winans albums